D109 is the main state road on the Dugi Otok Island in Croatia connecting Telašćica Nature Park and a number of island villages and resorts to Brbinj and Zaglav ferry ports, via the D124 and D125 respectively, from where Jadrolinija ferries fly to the mainland, docking in Zadar and the D407 state road.

The road, as well as all other state roads in Croatia, is managed and maintained by Hrvatske ceste, a state-owned company.

Traffic volume 

Traffic is regularly counted and reported by Hrvatske ceste (HC), operator of the road. Substantial variations between annual (AADT) and summer (ASDT) traffic volumes are attributed to the fact that the road connects a number of island resorts.

Road junctions and populated areas

Sources

See also
 Hrvatske ceste
 Jadrolinija

State roads in Croatia
Transport in Zadar County
Dugi Otok